The Large Cat, also known as Cat Sleeping, is a 1657 engraving by Dutch artist Cornelis Visscher (1629-1658).  Two states are  known.  It measures .

Visscher's engraving depicts a tabby cat crouching at rest, facing towards some plants seen in silhouette to the lower right.  The large cat nearly fills the frame.  Visscher expertly expresses the stiffness of the cat's whiskers, and the softness of its fur.  A mouse is emerging through the bars of an arched window to the left behind the cat.  A stone to the lower left reads "Corn. Visscher fecit", and the caption to the engraving states "CJVisscher Excudit".  It is possible that Visscher's depiction of a sleeping cat, ignoring the mouse creeping out behind it, is alluding to a Biblical verse, Proverbs 19:15, that " Slothfulness casteth into a deep sleep; and an idle soul shall suffer hunger." 

A preparatory drawing was sold in 1883 but has been lost.  Copies of the print are held in many public collections.  An example of the original print was sold at Christie's in 2009 for £1,125, and one at Bonhams in October 2018 for US$3,125.

References
  A catalogue of the works of Cornelius Visscher, William Smith, p.16
 The Large Cat, British Museum
 The Large Cat, Cornelis Visscher (II), 1657, Rijsmuseum	
  The Large Cat, National Gallery of Art
 Print, The Big Cat, 1657, Cooper Hewitt
 The Large Cat, 1657, Princeton University Art Museum
 Cornelis Visscher, The Large Cat, an engraving, Google Arts & Culture
 Cornelis Visscher (1629-1658), The Large Cat, Christie's 16 September 2009
 Cornelis Visscher (1629-1658), The Large Cat, Bonhams, 23 October 2018

17th-century engravings
Cats in art